Luis Gerardo Solano Chavarría (24 december 1953, in San José – 12 January 2000) was a Costa Rican professional footballer who played most of his career for Deportivo Saprissa and Herediano in the 1970s.

Club career
Solano was a member of the Saprissa squad that won six consecutive championships from 1972 to 1977, a record both in Costa Rica as well as in the Americas. He was the team's goalscorer with 57 in this period. He was the club's joint-leading scorer with eleven goals in 1973 and he played the most games for Saprissa in the 1970s. He played in 79 international club games.

Solano also won three titles with Herediano.

International career
Solano appeared in 9 matches for the full Costa Rica national football team from 1975 to 1980.

Death
Solano died of a heart attack while running in the city centre of Santa Cruz on 12 January 2000.

References

1954 births
2000 deaths
People from San José, Costa Rica
Association football forwards
Costa Rican footballers
Costa Rica international footballers
Deportivo Saprissa players
C.S. Herediano footballers